Dr. G. C. Gopala Pillai is an Indian bureaucrat, who is a former chairman and managing director of Fertilisers and Chemicals Travancore and the founder MD of Kerala Industrial Infrastructure Development Corporation (KINFRA).

His vision of a developed Kerala is seen in the plethora of projects he had visualised for the state through the public–private partnership. He headed Infrastructures Kerala Limited for a brief period of time.
He is also regarded as one of the most enterprising executives of Kerala.

He successfully steered a government owned firm KINFRA to become a success. He was appointed the Chairman of Public Sector Restructuring and Internal Audit Board, Government of Kerala after his stint at InKel.

Education
Dr. Pillai did his graduation from Mahatma Gandhi College, Thiruvananthapuram, and did an additional graduation in law and completed his MSW from Loyola College of Social Sciences, Thiruvananthapuram. Apart from the basic degrees, he has polished his skills with higher degrees from foreign universities like the PEMC course from University of Leeds, England.

Career 
In a career spanning over three decades and which still continues, Dr. Pillai has served in several organisations starting from the position of a middle executive in Keltron.

The nearly 14 years, he served in KINFRA saw that body become the most successful infrastructure firm run by the Kerala Government with numerous industrial parks started and run across the state.

 He was awarded fellowships by the All India Management Association (AIMA) and the National Institute of Personnel Management (NIPM) as a reward for his performance in different sectors. He was appointed Chairman and Managing Director of FACT, the largest public sector enterprise in Kerala through the Public Enterprises Selection Board (PESB), Government of India. Later due to the differences with the then Fertilizers Minister Ram Vilas Paswan, Dr. Pillai resigned his post .

Later, the Government of Kerala invited him to head INKEL, a new infrastructure firm akin to KINFRA but to be run by private participation. Now he is working as the Chairman of Kerala State Electronics Development Corporation Ltd.(KELTRON).

Personal life 
His wife, Latha, is a medical practitioner. His son Sabareesh Gopala Pillai, is an officer in the Indian Revenue Service.

References 

 *http://www.thehindubusinessline.com/2009/10/19/stories/2009101950511200.htm
 
 http://www.business-standard.com/india/news/cmd-resignation-leaves-fact-rudderless/268358/
 
 http://www.kinfra.com/newsletter/kinfra-august.pdf
 
 http://www.kinfra.com/newsletter/kinfra-July.pdf

Living people
Businesspeople from Kerala
Year of birth missing (living people)